David Wayne Allan (born September 25, 1936) is an American atomic clock physicist and author of the Allan variance, also known as the two-sample variance, a measure of frequency stability in clocks, oscillators and other applications. He worked for the National Bureau of Standards in Colorado.

Allan was born in born in Mapleton, Utah, on September 25, 1936. He studied physics at the Brigham Young University (B.S. 1960) and at the University of Colorado (M.S. 1965). From 1960 he was a physicist in the Time and Frequency Division of the National Institute of Standards and Technology (then the National Bureau of Standards) in Boulder, and from 1979 was 1988 chief of the Time and Frequency Coordination Group. He retired in 1992 and lives in Fountain Green, Utah.

Allan was a consultant for the United Nations Development Programme in New Delhi in 1981, and a guest scientist in the People's Republic of China in 1982.

He is a Mormon. He has been married since 1959.

Awards 

Allan received the Silver Medal of the Department of Commerce in 1968, and one of the IR-100 awards of Industrial Research magazine in 1976. He received the Rabi Award of the IEEE Ultrasonics, Ferroelectrics, and Frequency Control Society in 1984. In 1999 he was named an honorary fellow of the Institute of Navigation. In 2018 he received the Joseph F. Keithley Award in Instrumentation and Measurement of the Institute of Electrical and Electronics Engineers.

References 

Living people
21st-century American physicists
Latter Day Saints from Colorado
Brigham Young University alumni
University of Colorado alumni
1936 births
People from Mapleton, Utah
People from Fountain Green, Utah
Latter Day Saints from Utah